Walter Tracy (fl. 1413–1427) of Dorchester, Dorset, was an English politician and lawyer.

Nothing is known of his family, although it is likely he is related to fellow MP for Bridport, John Tracy.

He was a Member (MP) of the Parliament of England for Dorchester in May 1413, for Bridport in 1419 and for Melcombe Regis in 1427.

References

14th-century births
15th-century deaths
English MPs May 1413
Members of the Parliament of England for Dorchester
English MPs 1419
English MPs 1427